Portrait of a Lady on Fire is a 2019 French historical romantic drama film written and directed by Céline Sciamma, starring Noémie Merlant and Adèle Haenel. Set in France in the late 18th century, the film tells the story of an affair between an aristocrat and a painter commissioned to paint her portrait.

Portrait of a Lady on Fire was selected to compete for the Palme d'Or at the 2019 Cannes Film Festival. The film won the Queer Palm at Cannes, becoming the first film directed by a woman to win the award. Sciamma also won the award for Best Screenplay at Cannes. The film was theatrically released in France on 18 September 2019.

It was nominated for Independent Spirit Awards, Critics' Choice Awards and Golden Globe Awards for Best Foreign Language Film and was chosen by the National Board of Review as one of the top five foreign language films of 2019.

The film was one of three shortlisted by the French Ministry of Culture to be France's submission to the 92nd Academy Awards for Best International Feature Film.

Portrait of a Lady on Fire was voted the 30th greatest film of all time in the Sight & Sound 2022 critics’ poll.

Plot

At the end of the eighteenth century, Marianne, a painter, is teaching an art class in France. One of her students asks her about a painting of hers, which Marianne calls Portrait de la jeune fille en feu.

Years previously, Marianne arrives on a distant island in Brittany. She has been commissioned to paint a portrait of a young woman of the gentry named Héloïse, who is to be married off to a Milanese nobleman. Marianne is informed by Héloïse's mother, The Countess, that she has previously refused to pose for portraits, as she does not want to be married; she had been living in a convent before the suicide of her older sister necessitated her return and her betrothal. Marianne acts as Héloïse's hired companion to be able to paint her in secret and accompanies her on daily walks along the rugged coastline to memorize Héloïse's features.

Marianne finishes the portrait, but finds herself unable to betray Héloïse's trust and reveals her true reason for arriving. After Héloïse criticises the painting, which does not seem to portray her true nature, Marianne destroys the work. After seeing the destroyed work, Marianne explains her actions to The Countess by saying that she can create a better painting. As The Countess is getting ready to fire Marianne, Héloïse says that she will pose for Marianne. The Countess is shocked to hear this and gives Marianne five days to complete the new portrait while she is away on the mainland. Marianne is haunted throughout the house by visions of Héloïse in a wedding dress. One evening, they read the story of Orpheus and Eurydice and debate the true reason why Orpheus turns around to look at his wife, causing her to be returned to the underworld. Later, the two go to a bonfire gathering where women sing, during which Héloïse's dress briefly catches fire.

The next day, Marianne and Héloïse share their first kiss and have sex later that night. The pair spend the next few days together, during which their romance grows stronger, and they help Sophie, the house maid, have an abortion. With their affair about to be cut short by the ensuing return of The Countess, Marianne sketches a drawing of Héloïse to remember her by, and Héloïse asks Marianne to draw a nude sketch of herself on page 28 of her book. The Countess approves of the now completed portrait, and the next morning Marianne bids farewell. As she is about to leave the house, she hears Héloïse say, "Turn around". She turns and sees Héloïse in her wedding dress.

In the present, Marianne reveals that she saw Héloïse two more times. The first was in the form of a portrait at an art exhibition, in which Héloïse, with a child beside her, is portrayed holding a book and surreptitiously revealing the edge of page 28. The second time was at a concert in Milan, where she notices Héloïse among the patrons seated in the balcony across the theater from her. Unobserved, Marianne watches as Héloïse, overwhelmed with emotion, is brought to tears listening to the orchestra playing the Presto from "Summer" in Vivaldi's Four Seasons, the music that Marianne had played for her on a harpsichord years before.

Cast
 Noémie Merlant as Marianne 
 Adèle Haenel as Héloïse
 Luàna Bajrami as Sophie
 Valeria Golino as The Countess

Production
Principal photography began in October 2018 and was completed after 38 days. Filming took place in Saint-Pierre-Quiberon in Brittany and a château in La Chapelle-Gauthier, Seine-et-Marne. The film was produced by Lilies Films, Arte France Cinéma, and Hold Up Films.

The paintings and sketches in the film were made by artist Hélène Delmaire. She painted for 16 hours every day during the course of filming, basing her painting on the blocking of the scenes. Her hands were also featured in the film. To mark the release of the film in France, Delmaire's paintings from Portrait of a Lady on Fire were exhibited at the Galerie Joseph in Paris from 20 to 22 September 2019.

Soundtrack
Sciamma decided to do without a conventional score. Instead, the soundtrack consists of an original single,  ( 'The Young Lady on Fire'), by composers Para One and Arthur Simonini. The song—performed by Sequenza 9.3, with Catherine Simonpiétri conducting—is scored for female choir a cappella and rhythmic clapping. According to Para One, although he and Simonini researched eighteenth century period music, they nonetheless recommended to Sciamma "a modern sound" inspired by György Ligeti's Requiem. Sciamma provided the lyrics: the (repeated) Latin phrase '' and coda ''—roughly translated as 'They cannot escape' and 'We rise', respectively.

In a review of the song for Slate, Matthew Dessum writes, "The parsimonious use of music in the rest of the film makes the [singing of  during the] bonfire scene completely overwhelming for characters and audience alike, so intense that it is almost unbearable. The music is beautiful, it is transporting, it is ". Writing in Paste, Ellen Johnson concurred: "It's utterly shocking to hear the strange chant after more than an hour of almost no music at all, but that's what makes it so timely ... [it's] a skin-tingling experience."

The film features Vivaldi's 3rd Movement ("Summer") Presto from "The Four Seasons" album by Italian Baroque orchestra La Serenissima.

Release
On 22 August 2018, film distributor MK2 began the sale of international rights to the film, with Pyramide Films acquiring the distribution rights for France. On 10 February 2019, Curzon Artificial Eye acquired the rights for the United Kingdom, Karma Films did so for Spain, Cinéart for Benelux, and Folkets Bio for Sweden. Neon and Hulu acquired the distribution rights for North America on 22 May.

Portrait of a Lady on Fire was released in France on 18 September 2019. The film premiered theatrically in the United States as a limited release on 6 December 2019, followed by a wide release on 14 February 2020. It was released in the United Kingdom on 28 February 2020.

Critical response
Portrait of a Lady on Fire was the subject of broad acclaim. The website's critical consensus reads, "A singularly rich period piece, Portrait of a Lady on Fire finds stirring, thought-provoking drama within a powerfully acted romance." On Metacritic, the film has a weighted average score of 95 out of 100, based on 48 critics, indicating "universal acclaim", and has been designated a Metacritic "Must See" movie. It is the second best reviewed film of 2019.
 
A. O. Scott of The New York Times wrote that Portrait of a Lady on Fire is  a "subtle and thrilling love story, at once unsentimental in its realistic assessment of women's circumstances", describing the unfolding of Marianne and Héloïse's relationship as "less a chronicle of forbidden desire than an examination of how desire works" and "the dangerous, irresistible power of looking". Mark Kermode from The Observer/The Guardian gave the film five stars and said it is "an intellectually erotic study of power and passion in which observed becomes observer, authored becomes author, returning time and again to a central question: 'If you look at me, who do I look at?', and described the unwanted pregnancy subplot as "confronting but also depicting a taboo subject and its representation, refusing to look away, finding strength in sorority." In his review for Variety, Peter Debruge said about Sciamma as director and screenwriter: "Though this gorgeous, slow-burn lesbian romance works strongly enough on a surface level, one can hardly ignore the fact, as true then as it is now, that the world looks different when seen through a woman's eyes", describing the film as "rigorously scripted", and her approach "looking past surfaces in an attempt to capture deeper emotion".

For The New Yorker, writer Rachel Syme said Portrait of a Lady on Fire thoroughly examines “the entanglements between artistic creation and burgeoning love, between memory and ambition and freedom. The film is about the erotic, electric connection between women when they find their desire for creative experience fulfilled in each other, but it is equally about the powers of art to validate, preserve, and console after a romance is over”.

The film was voted the 30th greatest film of all time in the  Sight and Sound Greatest Films of All Time 2022, the highest of films released in the 2010s.

Accolades

Home media
The DVD and Blu-ray for Zone 2 was released by Pyramide Video on 18 February 2020. The film was released as VOD on Hulu on 27 March 2020. The DVD for Region 1 and Blu-ray for Region A was released by The Criterion Collection on 23 June 2020.

Notes

References

Further reading

External links
  Portrait of a Lady on Fire at Pyramide Films 
  Portrait of a Lady on Fire at MK2 Films
  Portrait of a Lady on Fire (2019 Festival de Cannes Press Kit). Lilies Films, 17 pp  
 
  Portrait de la jeune fille en feu at Lumiere
  Portrait de la jeune fille en feu at UniFrance
Portrait of a Lady on Fire: Daring to See an essay by Ela Bittencourt at the Criterion Collection

2019 films
2019 independent films
2019 LGBT-related films
2010s historical drama films
2019 romantic drama films
2010s feminist films
2010s French films
2010s French-language films
2010s historical romance films
French historical drama films
French LGBT-related films
Lesbian-related films
LGBT-related romantic drama films
Films about abortion
Films about fictional painters
Films about infidelity
Films set on islands
Films set in the 1760s
Films set in the 18th century
Films set in Brittany
Films set in Paris
Films directed by Céline Sciamma
Madman Entertainment
Neon (distributor) films
Queer Palm winners